Anita Dongre (née Sawlani) (born 3 October 1963) is an Indian fashion designer. She is the founder of House of Anita Dongre, an Indian fashion house.

Early life 
Dongre was born in Mumbai, in the state of Maharashtra. Her mother, Pushpa Sawlani, used to stitch clothes for Anita and her 5 siblings when they were kids. Later in life, Anita studied fashion design at SNDT college located in Mumbai. She pursued a Degree course in Fashion designing.

Career 

Dongre launched her jewellery brand Anita Dongre Pink City, which also features under House of Anita Dongre.

In the year 2015, AND Designs India Limited re-branded itself as House of Anita Dongre. House of Anita Dongre currently shelters AND (western wear), Global Desi (boho-chic brand inspired by the folk tales of India), and her signature label ANITA DONGRE. She has recently introduced Anita Dongre Grassroot to her fashion house. She is also the founder of Pink City, a jadau fine jewellery brand.

On March 28, 2019, the Board of House of Anita Dongre Limited (HOADL), as part of its corporate restructuring, transferred the businesses under its two brands, AND and Global Desi under a slump sale arrangement to a newly formed wholly-owned subsidiary, Ochre and Black Private Limited (OBPL) - effective April 1, 2019. HOADL will continue to manage the business under its two brands - Anita Dongre and Grassroot.

Dongre's brother and sister handle the operations of the business, while she focuses on the design front. She features as the Chief Creative Officer of the company.

Personal life 

Anita Dongre is married to Pravin Dongre, a businessman and has a son named Yash Dongre, who is also a part of Dongre's business.

Dongre is a vegan activist and a member of the organisation People for the Ethical Treatment of Animals (PETA).

Awards and recognitions 

 In 2008, she received the GR8 Flo Women Achievers Award for ‘Excellence in Fashion Design’. 
 In 2013, The Federation of Indian Chambers of Commerce and Industry Ladies Organization, Bombay Chapter, presented an award to Dongre for ‘Excellence in Fashion Design’.
 In 2014, she received the EY Entrepreneur of the year award.
 She received the Pantene Shine Award for helping women shine.

References

External links 
 Official website

Indian women fashion designers
1963 births
Living people
Artists from Mumbai
Women artists from Maharashtra
People from Bandra
21st-century Indian designers
21st-century Indian women artists
Businesspeople from Mumbai
Businesswomen from Maharashtra